The Oregon Convention Center is a convention center in Portland, Oregon. Completed in 1989 and opened in 1990, it is located on the east side of the Willamette River in the Lloyd District neighborhood. It is best known for the twin spire towers, which provide light into the building's interior and for housing the world's largest Foucault pendulum. The center is owned by Metro, the Portland area's regional government, and operated by the Metropolitan Exposition and Recreation Commission, a subsidiary of Metro.

The building was designed by the architectural firm of Zimmer Gunsul Frasca Architects (ZGF). The complex includes  of exhibit space. The original building was built in the late 1980s, opened in 1990, and was expanded in 2003. ZGF was also involved in designing the expansion. More recently, the building has become known for upward illuminating the twin spires yearly on September 11 in memorial of the events of 9/11. 

The convention center has a focus on sustainability.  It was the first existing one to receive the highest, platinum rating in the U.S. Green Building Council's LEED certification program and is the only one to have it for operations and maintenance. A 6,500-panel solar array provides about 25 percent of the electricity used, and is the second largest one on a convention center in the country.  The remaining electricity and gas usage is offset with renewable energy credits. In addition, a rain garden filters run off from the roof before it reaches waterways.  A waste diversion policy is also in effect, requiring a deposit from large events and banning certain non-recyclable items. Reusable materials and surplus food is donated to local non-profits.

The region's light rail system, TriMet's MAX, serves the center with a station on Holladay Street. The Portland Streetcar system began serving the center in 2012, with the opening of a new line called the CL Line; this was renamed the Loop Service in 2015.  TriMet bus route 6 also serves the facility.

The building and grounds also have an extensive set of public art, with works from over two dozen mainly Pacific Northwest artists. The collection includes paintings, plaques, glass and ceramic tiles, sconces, mosaics, bells, and parts of a large Douglas fir.  Each of the towers has a focal point artwork, with a colorful 40-foot-long Chinese dragon boat suspended in the east tower, and Principia by Jones/Ginzel, a dramatic Foucault pendulum hanging over a gilded halo of rays and an inlaid fantasy solar system in the floor of the north tower.

The plaza, known as the Oregon Convention Center Plaza, opened in January 2012.

Metro has proposed a 600-room hotel adjacent to the Convention Center, to be built by Mortenson Construction, then owned and operated as a Hyatt Regency. The $212 million hotel would be partially paid for by Metro using $60 million in revenue bonds and $18 million from Oregon Lottery funds, loans, and grants. The plan has attracted criticism from existing hoteliers as being an unfair subsidy, while Metro has championed it as a way to attract larger conventions. Suits from opponents were rejected in county courts, and in May 2015, the Oregon Legislature authorized Metro to issue the bonds.  Construction of the Hyatt Regency Portland began in 2017, and the hotel opened in December 2019.

The convention center has hosted the Northwest National Association of Music Education conference. The site is suitable for the event due to a large performing area and multiple rooms for chamber groups and lectures. There is an EMT in the building during events. 

The convention center was chosen as the host venue for the 2016 IAAF World Indoor Championships after Portland won their bid over Birmingham, England. For the event, the building was fitted with a 200m track and seating for 8,000 spectators.

On March 20, 2020, amidst the 2019–20 coronavirus pandemic, the center was turned into Portland's second temporary shelter for the homeless population of the city in order to protect them from being infected by COVID-19. The shelter will cease to exist when Governor Kate Brown lifts the ban on large public gatherings.

See also
2016 IAAF World Indoor Championships
Portland International Auto Show

References

External links

 
Oregon Convention Center on Emporis.com

1990 establishments in Oregon
Convention centers in Oregon
Lloyd District, Portland, Oregon
Metro (Oregon regional government)
Northeast Portland, Oregon
Skyscrapers in Portland, Oregon
Tourist attractions in Portland, Oregon